Aithsetter (Old Norse: Eiðseti, meaning "the farm at the isthmus") is a village on the island of Mainland, in Shetland, Scotland. Aithsetter is in the parish of Dunrossness, towards the north end of the district of Cunningsburgh and formerly of that ancient parish. It is nearly 10 miles from Lerwick.

References

External links

Canmore - Broch of Aithsetter site record

Villages in Mainland, Shetland